This is a list of films which have placed number one at the weekend box office in Spain during 2008.

See also
 List of Spanish films — Spanish films by year

References

 

2008
Box
Spain